The Uva cricket team is a Sri Lankan first class cricket team that represents Uva Province. The team was established in 2004 and only featured in the 2003-04 season of the Inter-Provincial First Class Tournament. The team was captained by Chaminda Vaas. In 2011 the team will be returning for the 2010–11 Inter-Provincial Limited Over Tournament.

History

2003-04 Ten Sports Inter-Provincial Tournament
The team played 4 matches overall but won only 1 against North Central Province (17 Jan 2003) but lost matches against Western Province (9 Jan 2003), Southern Province (24 Jan 2003) and Central Province (30 Jan 2003).

2010

The team returned to participate in the 2010–11 Inter-Provincial Limited Over Tournament after a six-year gap and finished bottom of the table with a similar record of winning 1 and losing 3. They won only 1 match against Wayamba Elevens but lost against Ruhuna, Kandurata and Basnahira. But this time their captain was Thilina Kandamby.

Players

Current squad
Players with international caps are listed in bold.

Notable players

 Avishka Gunawardene
 Chamila Gamage
 Chaminda Vaas
 Dhammika Sudarshana
 Dilhara Lokuhettige
 Ian Daniel
 Jeevantha Kulatunga
 Malintha Gajanayake
 Muthumudalige Pushpakumara
 Naveed Nawaz
 Niroshan Bandaratilleke
 Ravindra Pushpakumara
 Upul Chandana

Honours

First Class

Inter-Provincial First Class Tournament: 0

List A

Inter-Provincial Limited Over Tournament: 0

Twenty20

Sri Lanka Premier League: 0

References

Former senior cricket clubs of Sri Lanka